The Frank Murphy Birthplace, located at 142 S. Huron St. in Harbor Beach, Michigan, is the birthplace of U.S. Supreme Court justice and Michigan governor Frank Murphy. The house was added to the National Register of Historic Places on September 22, 1971. The City of Harbor Beach operates the Frank Murphy Memorial Museum in the home.

History
This house was owned by John F. Murphy, Frank's father, who used one wing of it as a law office. Frank Murphy was born in the home on April 13, 1890. The family later moved into a larger house next door, which is also part of the Frank Murphy Memorial Museum.

Description
The house is a 1 ½-story frame building with clapboard siding and a gable roof. The upper windows are double-hung, six-over-six units. A small, single-story wing is attached to the side, which was used as a law office by John F. Murphy, Frank's father. The interior has a simple four-room layout, and contains a number of furnishings originally owner by the Murphy family.

References

External links
 Museums - City of Harbor Beach Parks and Recreation

Houses on the National Register of Historic Places in Michigan
Houses in Huron County, Michigan
Historic house museums in Michigan
Museums in Huron County, Michigan
Murphy, Frank
National Register of Historic Places in Huron County, Michigan